Naval Hospital Corps School was the United States Navy's only basic hospital corpsman school. It was located within Lake County, Illinois, at 601 D St., Bldg 130H, Naval Station, Great Lakes, Illinois 60088, for nearly a century.

History
It was established in January 1913. It is an "A" School. Its mission is to field Basic Hospital Corpsmen into the fleet. The mission of Naval Hospital Corps School is to develop, teach basic principles and techniques of patient care and first aid procedures and put forward Hospital Corpsmen into the fleet: aboard ships, aboard Naval Hospitals, Department of Defense medical facilities, with United States Marine Corps units, or elsewhere. Previously there were hospital corps schools located in San Diego, CA and Orlando, FL, and Bainbridge, MD.

The Great Lakes A-School closed there after the last class graduated on July 28, 2011. Its last class was Class 11-125. The school relocated—along with the newly commissioned Naval Medicine Training Center command—to the Medical Education and Training Campus at Fort Sam Houston, Joint Base San Antonio, Texas. Corpsman A-School lasts 19 weeks and may change according to scheduling and holidays.

See also
Hospital Corpsman Pledge
Hospital Corpsman Prayer

References

Education in Lake County, Illinois
Medicine in the United States Navy
United States Navy schools and training